Suk Jong-yul (born 6 February 1969) is a South Korean professional golfer.

Suk broke into the upper ranks of the sport at a relatively advanced age. He won the China Amateur in 2000, 2001 and 2002, and in the last of those years he also won the Ik Sam Open, a professional event in South Korea, as an amateur. He turned professional in 2003. In 2006 he won the Asian Tour's GS Caltex Maekyung Open in his home country.

Professional wins (3)

Asian Tour wins (1)

1Co-sanctioned by the Korean Tour

Other wins (1)
2002 Ik Sam Open (as an amateur)

Japan PGA Senior Tour wins (1)
2019 ISPS Handa Cup Philanthropy Senior Tournament

External links

South Korean male golfers
Asian Tour golfers
1969 births
Living people